Nataliya Vitaliïvna Lialchuk-Mustafeyeva (born 11 August 1985 in Rivne, Ukrainian SSR, Soviet Union) is a Ukrainian-born Azerbaijani rower who formerly competed for Ukraine. She finished 4th in the women's quadruple sculls at the 2008 Summer Olympics, where she represented Ukraine. She competed for Azerbaijan in the single sculls race at the 2012 Summer Olympics and placed 6th in Final B and 12th overall.

References
Citations

Sources

External links
 

1985 births
Living people
Ukrainian female rowers
Sportspeople from Rivne
Ukrainian emigrants to Azerbaijan
Naturalized citizens of Azerbaijan
Olympic rowers of Ukraine
Rowers at the 2008 Summer Olympics
Azerbaijani female rowers